Benjamin Colin James Cutting (born 30 January 1987) is an Australian cricketer who plays as an all-rounder. Cutting represented Australia in one-day internationals and T20 matches, and at the 2006 U-19 Cricket World Cup in Sri Lanka. Cutting played first-class cricket for the Queensland between 2007 and 2018 before opting to play only white-ball cricket.

Domestic career
Cutting made his first-class cricket debut for the Queensland Bulls against Tasmania in the first Pura Cup game of the 2007–08 season and despite his first ball going for five wides, ended up taking three wickets including that of Michael Di Venuto. In 2009–10 Cutting was one of the competition's leading wicket takers, with 25 wickets from his first six matches, raising hopes that he may be selected to represent Australia in Test cricket. He finished the season as the leading wicket taker – 46 wickets at 23.91. This included a career best 6/37 against Tasmania, and led to speculation of a future international debut.

On 3 April 2018, Cutting announced his retirement from first-class and List A cricket after a 12-year career in order to focus on his Twenty20 game and develop his new business. In September 2018, he was named in the squad of Nangarhar Leopards in the first edition of the Afghanistan Premier League tournament. He was the joint-leading wicket-taker for the Nangarhar Leopards in the tournament, with twelve dismissals in nine matches.

International career
On 13 January 2013, Cutting made his One Day International (ODI) debut and on 26 January 2013 he made his T20 international debut.

In August 2017, he was named in a World XI side to play three Twenty20 International matches against Pakistan in the 2017 Independence Cup in Lahore.

T20 franchise cricket
He first made a mark in Indian Premier League 2016 by finishing off the finals match in favour of the Sunrisers Hyderabad.

In January 2018, he was bought by the Mumbai Indians in the 2018 IPL auction.

In June 2019, he was selected to play for the Edmonton Royals franchise team in the 2019 Global T20 Canada tournament. In July 2019, he was selected to play for the Amsterdam Knights in the inaugural edition of the Euro T20 Slam cricket tournament. However, the following month the tournament was cancelled. He was released by the Mumbai Indians ahead of the 2020 IPL auction.

In 2020 he was picked by the Quetta Gladiators in the draft for the Pakistan Super League 5. In February 2021, Cutting was bought by the Kolkata Knight Riders in the IPL auction ahead of the 2021 Indian Premier League. In July 2022, he was signed by the Dambulla Giants for the third edition of the Lanka Premier League.

Personal life
Cutting is married to Australian model Erin Holland.

References

External links

1987 births
Living people
Cricketers from Brisbane
Australian cricketers
Australia One Day International cricketers
Australia Twenty20 International cricketers
World XI Twenty20 International cricketers
Queensland cricketers
Brisbane Heat cricketers
Rajasthan Royals cricketers
Sunrisers Hyderabad cricketers
Mumbai Indians cricketers
St Kitts and Nevis Patriots cricketers
Nangarhar Leopards cricketers
Quetta Gladiators cricketers
Sydney Thunder cricketers
Peshawar Zalmi cricketers
Karachi Kings cricketers